Spinvis is a Dutch one-man music project centred on Erik de Jong (born 2 February 1961, Spijkenisse). Using experimental, lo-fi music, Spinvis has earned two gold records in the Netherlands, and performed sold-out tours in both the Netherlands and Belgium.

Biography

Spinvis
In 2001, Erik de Jong, or Spinvis, at the age of 40, sent a three-song demo to the Dutch indie label, Excelsior Recordings. Within two weeks, a record deal was signed. The label decided to keep the songs that had been recorded by Spinvis on his home computer. With some minor mixing touch-ups these songs comprised Spinvis' first album, released in the Netherlands on 1 April 2002. The music press responded with positive reviews and the album reached number one in Oor magazine's Moordlijst, an alternative chart in the Netherlands.

De Jong began touring, and played at the Crossing Border Festival in Amsterdam with Toots Thielemans. He at the end of 2002, Spinvis' song "Smalfilm" was second in the VPRO's Song of the Year 2002 contest.  In addition to this De Jong received an Essent Award, a prize for breakthrough artists.

Spinvis and his ensemble completed a brief tour in early 2003. With labelmates Bauer, De Jong created a track for a Dutch music webzine compilation. In August, Spinvis performed in Germany (Haldern Open Air) and Belgium (Pukkelpop). On 1 December, "Nieuwegein aan Zee" was released, containing a live registration and a number of unreleased tracks. On 17 December, Spinvis performed with an orchestra in Vredenburg, Utrecht.

In early 2004, Spinvis won two Dutch awards, the Silver Harp and the Annie M.G. Schmidt prize.  In honour of the fourth edition of the Cross-Linx festival De Jong composed a musical piece that consists of three rhythmical monologues. Actress Roos Ouwehand, opera singer Lucia Meeuwsen and actor Hans Dagelet performed the pieces together with Spinvis. For filmmaker Theo van Gogh, Spinvis wrote the title song for the television series Medea. This six-part series on Dutch politics was shown in the winter of 2004. In this busy year Spinvis also contributed to Claudia de Breij's song "Nieuwbouwwijk".

Dagen van gras, dagen van stro
During the Noorderslag music festival, the Ringtone Society presented a website that promoted the artistic development of ringtones. Spinvis participated in this project. The song "Idee Zeventien" ('Idea Seventeen') appeared on the compilation The Pet Series: Volume 4. During spring 2005, Spinvis Performed in Dutch theaters with his Lotus Europa tour. The band Solo played as support act. In April, Spinvis created a theatrical show in which he mixed stock footage with music and dialogue. Together with Hans Dagelet, Spinvis performed the piece. On 11 September, Spinvis' performance at the Dutch Moroccan Music Experience was cancelled because the organisers objected to the lyrics of the song "Het Mes van God" ('The Dagger of God'). The song's lyrics were considered too sensitive as Spinvis refers to Theo van Gogh's assassination in November 2004. Spinvis made a guest appearance on the album Geluiden van Weleer of the band, at the close of every day. In November, his own album Dagen van gras, dagen van stro was released. The album's title is a translation of Days of Grass, Days of Straw, a book by R.A. Lafferty from 1973. The first single from the album was "Het Voordeel van Video" (The Advantage of Video). In December, Spinvis began a tour in support of the album.

The second single was "Ik wil alleen maar zwemmen" (I just want to swim). De Jong created a new mix for the song and also added a dub version to the release. The song "Voor ik vergeet" (Before I forget) became part of Strips in Stereo. For this project, visual artists drew comics based on 14 Dutch songs. Hanco Kolk drew the graphics for Spinvis' song. Strips in Stereo was presented in Paradiso, Amsterdam, in March, in conjunction with Boekenweek 2006 (the annual 'book week' where awards are awarded and writers meet during the 'book ball').

JA!
Together with Meindert Talma, De Kift, at the close of every day, Andre Manuel, Mondo Leone and D’r Sjaak, Spinvis was part of the NL Impressionisten. In groups of two, the artists performed for a number of months throughout the Netherlands, starting on 18 March 2006. Two days later JA! was released, the 100th Excelsior Recordings release. Spinvis recorded it with poet Simon Vinkenoog and Arjan Witte (keys). The men played several dates in support of the album: Rotterdam, Antwerp, Groningen and Drachten were visited. Following this Spinvis and Vinkenoog wasted no time and performed the show De Suikerklok (The Sugar Clock). In the summer, Spinvis and his band performed at Lowlands, Waterpop and Folk Dranouter amongst other festivals.

Discography
 Spinvis (2002)
 Dagen van gras, dagen van stro (2005)
 Ja! (2006)
 Goochelaars & Geesten (2007)
 Ritmebox (2008)
 Tot Ziens, Justine Keller (2011)
 Trein Vuur Dageraad (2017)
 7.6.9.6. (2020)

References

External links 

  (in Dutch)

1961 births
Living people
Dutch musicians
People from Spijkenisse